Gérard Edelinck (20 October 1640 (baptized) – 2 April 1707) was a copper-plate engraver and print publisher of  Flemish origin, who worked in Paris from 1666 and became a naturalized French citizen in 1675.

Life
Edelinck was born in Antwerp, where he received his early training under the engravers Gaspar Huybrechts (1619–1684) and Cornelius Galle the Younger. He went to Paris in 1666, where he worked with his fellow Fleming Nicolas Pitau the elder. To improve himself further he subsequently studied under François de Poilly, Robert Nanteuil, and Philippe de Champaigne. These masters likewise had soon done all they could to help him onwards, and Edelinck ultimately took the first rank among line engravers.

His excellence was generally acknowledged; and having become known to Louis XIV he was appointed, on the recommendation of Le Brun, teacher at the academy established at the Gobelins manufactory for the training of workers in tapestry. He was also entrusted with the execution of several important works. In 1677 he won admission to the Académie royale de peinture et de sculpture (Royal Academy of Painting and Sculpture) with his Portrait of Philippe de Champaigne, engraved after a self-portrait.

Work

The work of this great engraver constitutes an epoch in the art. His prints number more than four hundred. Edelinck stands above and apart from his predecessors and contemporaries in that he excelled, not in some one respect, but in all respects, that while one engraver attained excellence in correct form, and another in rendering light and shade, and others in giving color to their prints and the texture of surfaces, he, as supreme master of the burin, possessed and displayed all these separate qualities, in so complete a harmony that the eye is not attracted by any one of them in particular, but rests in the satisfying whole.

Edelinck was especially good as an engraver of portraits, and executed prints of many of the most eminent persons of his time. Among these are those of Le Brun, Rigaud, Champaigne, Nanteuil, La Fontaine, Colbert, John Dryden, Descartes, Jean-Baptiste Lully, etc. He died at Paris in 1707. His younger brother Jean, and his son Nicholas, were also engravers.

Works
Among his most famous works are:
Holy Family, after Raphael
Penitent Magdalene, after Charles le Brun
Alexander at the Tent of Darius, after Le Brun
Combat of Four Knights, after Leonardo da Vinci
Christ surrounded with Angels, after Le Brun
St. Louis praying, after Le Brun
St Charles Borromeo before a crucifix, after Le Brun

Notes

References
 Gründ, publisher (2006). Benezit: Dictionary of Artists. Paris: Gründ. .
 Préaud, Maxime (1998), "Edelinck, Gérard", vol. 9, p. 718, in The Dictionary of Art, edited by Jane Turner. London: Macmillan. .
Attribution:

External links
 

1640 births
1707 deaths
17th-century French engravers
18th-century French engravers
Flemish engravers
Flemish Baroque painters
Portrait engravers
Artists from Antwerp